Guy Harpigny (born 13 April 1948 in Luttre, Belgium) is a Belgian Bishop of the Catholic Church. 

He was ordained to the priesthood on 7 July 1973. On 22 May 2003 he was appointed Bishop of the Diocese of Tournai by Pope John Paul II and consecrated on 7 September 2003.

References

External links

Bishops of Tournai
Living people
1948 births
Bishops appointed by Pope John Paul II